St. Swithun's Church (alternative spelling Swithin), named after St. Swithen who was an Anglo-Saxon bishop of Winchester, can refer to numerous churches:

United Kingdom 
St Swithun’s Church, Great Dalby, Leicestershire
St Swithun's Church, Allington, Dorset
Church of St Swithin, Bath, Somerset
St Swithun's Church, Bathford, Somerset
Church of St Swithin, Bicker, Lincolnshire
St Swithun's Church, Bintree, Norfolk
St Swithun's Church, Bournemouth, Dorset
St Swithun's Church, Brookthorpe, Gloucestershire
St Swithun's Church, Cheswardine, Shropshire
St Swithun's Church, Clunbury, Shropshire
St Swithun's Church, Combe, Berkshire
St Swithun's Church, Crampmoor, Hampshire
St Swithun's Church, East Grinstead, West Sussex
St Swithun's Church, East Retford, Nottinghamshire 
Church of St Swithin, Ganarew, Herefordshire
St Swithun's Church, Great Chishill, Cambridgeshire
St Swithun's Church, Headbourne Worthy, Hampshire
St Swithun's Church, Hinton Parva, Wiltshire
St Swithun's Church, Hither Green, London
St Swithin's Church, Holmesfield, Derbyshire
St Swithun's Churches, Kennington, Oxfordshire
St Swithun's Church, Kirklington, Nottinghamshire
St Swithun's Church, Leonard Stanley, Gloucestershire
St Swithin's Church, Lincoln, Lincolnshire
St Swithun's Church, Littleham, Devon
St Swithin, London Stone, former church in the City of London
St Swithun's Church, Martyr Worthy, Hampshire
St Swithun's Church, Merton, Oxfordshire
St. Swithun's, Nately Scures, Hampshire
St Swithin's Church, Pyworthy, Devon
St Swithun's Church, Sandy, Bedfordshire
St Swithun's Church, Shobrooke, Devon, England
St Swithun's Church, Swanbourne, Buckinghamshire
St Swithun's Church, Thorley, Isle of Wight
St Swithin's Church, Wellow, Nottinghamshire
St Swithun-upon-Kingsgate Church, Winchester, Hampshire
St Swithun's Church, Woodborough, Nottinghamshire
St Swithun's Church, Woodbury, Devon
St Swithun's Church, Worcester

Other places
St. Svithun's Church (Stavanger), Norway
St Swithun's Church, Saint Lucy, Barbados